The 2nd Corps (Turkish: 2. Kolordu) is a field corps of the Turkish Army. It is headquartered at Gelibolu in Çanakkale Province. In 2013 it appeared to be under command of Major General Mustafa Oğuz.

In 1941, it appears to have been part of the Second Army's Dardanelles and Marmara Area, and had its headquarters at Gelibolu with the 4th Infantry Division, the 69th Infantry Division, the 32nd Infantry Division, the 66th Infantry Division, and the 72nd Infantry Brigade.

In 1943, Nuri Yamut, a career Artillery officer, was appointed to the 2nd Corps Command in Gallipoli.

In 1974, it was part of the First Army (Turkey).

In 1995–96, Lale Sarıibrahimoğlu reported that the corps consisted of the: 
Corps Headquarters (Gelibolu)
4th Mechanized Infantry Brigade (Keşan)
8th Mechanized Infantry Brigade (Tekirdağ)
18th Mechanized Infantry Brigade (Gelibolu)
95th Armored Brigade  (Malkara)
5th Commando Regiment  ( Imbros )
41st Commando Brigade ( Vize )

References

Corps of Turkey
Military in Çanakkale